Sadovy is a rural locality (a settlement) in Nachalovsky Selsoviet, Privolzhsky District, Astrakhan Oblast, Russia. The population was 513 as of 2010. There is 1 street.

Geography 
Sadovy is located 6 km northwest of Nachalovo (the district's administrative centre) by road. Novonachalovsky is the nearest rural locality.

References 

Rural localities in Privolzhsky District, Astrakhan Oblast